Carabus nanschanicus is a species of black coloured ground beetle in the Carabinae subfamily that can be found in Qinghai and Sichuan provinces of China.

References

nanschanicus
Endemic fauna of China
Insects of China
Beetles described in 1898
Taxa named by Andrey Semyonov-Tyan-Shansky